Andrea Casasnovas (born 27 August 1987) is a Spanish alpine skier. She competed in the women's downhill at the 2006 Winter Olympics.

References

1987 births
Living people
Spanish female alpine skiers
Olympic alpine skiers of Spain
Alpine skiers at the 2006 Winter Olympics
Sportspeople from Zaragoza